The Citadel Bulldogs basketball teams represented The Citadel, The Military College of South Carolina in Charleston, South Carolina, United States.  The program was established in 1900–01, and has continuously fielded a team since 1912–13.  Their primary rivals are College of Charleston, Furman and VMI.

1974–75

|-
|colspan=7 align=center|1975 Southern Conference men's basketball tournament

1975–76

|-
| colspan=7 align=center|1976 Southern Conference men's basketball tournament

1976–77

|-
| colspan=7 align=center|1977 Southern Conference men's basketball tournament

1977–78

|-
| colspan=7 align=center|1978 Southern Conference men's basketball tournament

1978–79

|-
| colspan=7 align=center|1979 Southern Conference men's basketball tournament

References
 

The Citadel Bulldogs basketball seasons